"Green-backed heron" is a collective term for certain herons. Small and compact among herons, these birds often feature green plumage – rare among the Ardeidae –, in particular on the back, wings and scapulars.

They were formerly believed to make up a single species Butorides striata, but are now treated as three largely allopatric species:

 Striated heron, Butorides striata – Widespread throughout the Old World tropics and in South America (Note that the grammatical gender of the specific name has been corrected from striatus)
 Lava heron, Butorides sundevalli – Endemic to the Galápagos Islands off Ecuador
 Green heron, Butorides virescens – Widespread from temperate North America south to Panama

These herons are tool-using animals. They are regularly seen picking up objects to use as a fishing lure, attracting prey fish.

Footnotes

References
 Boswall, J. (1983): Tool-using and related behavior in birds: more notes. Avicultural Magazine 89: 94-108.
 Norris, D. (1975): Green Heron (Butorides virescens) uses feather lure for fishing. American Birds 29: 652–654.
 Robinson, S.K. (1994): Use of bait and lures by Green-backed herons in Amazonian Peru. Wilson Bulletin 106(3): 569-571
 Walsh, J.F.; Grunewald, J. & Grunewald, B. (1985): Green-backed herons  (Butorides striatus) possibly using a lure and using apparent bait. J. Ornithol. 126: 439–442.

External links 
 Green heron fishing with lure on YouTube

Butorides
Herons
Obsolete bird taxa
Birds by common name